is a professional Japanese baseball player. He plays pitcher for the Hiroshima Toyo Carp.

External links

NPB.com

1987 births
Hiroshima Toyo Carp players
Living people
Nippon Professional Baseball pitchers
Baseball people from Ōita Prefecture
Yomiuri Giants players
Japanese expatriate baseball players in Australia
Melbourne Aces players
Gigantes de Carolina players
Japanese expatriate baseball players in Puerto Rico